The Union Railroad Port Perry Bridge is a truss bridge that carries the Pennsylvania Union Railroad across the Monongahela River between Duquesne, Pennsylvania and the former town site of Port Perry in North Versailles, Pennsylvania. Industrial pipelines adorn the bridge, as coke oven gas originating from U.S. Steel's Clairton Coke Works is conveyed to the company's Edgar Thomson Steel Works near the north end of the bridge for use as fuel. Union Railroad is owned and operated by Transtar, Inc., a subsidiary of U.S. Steel.

Railroad bridges in Pennsylvania
Bridges over the Monongahela River
Bridges completed in 1898
Bridges in Allegheny County, Pennsylvania
U.S. Steel
Metal bridges in the United States
Truss bridges in the United States
1898 establishments in Pennsylvania